Steven Michael Farr (born December 12, 1956) is a former professional baseball player who pitched primarily as a closer in the Major Leagues from 1984 to 1994. Farr graduated from DeMatha High School outside Washington in 1974 and then played college baseball at American University for a year before signing a professional contract with the Pittsburgh Pirates.

See also
List of Major League Baseball career games finished leaders

References and notes

External links

The 100 Greatest Royals of All-Time: #47 Steve Farr

1956 births
Living people
Cleveland Indians players
Kansas City Royals players
New York Yankees players
Boston Red Sox players
Major League Baseball pitchers
DeMatha Catholic High School alumni
American Eagles baseball players
Niagara Falls Pirates players
Charleston Pirates players
Salem Pirates players
Buffalo Bisons (minor league) players
Portland Beavers players
Maine Guides players
Omaha Royals players
Baseball players from Maryland
People from La Plata, Maryland